There is no current State Route 98 in the U.S. state of Alabama.

See U.S. Route 98 in Alabama for the current route numbered 98
See Alabama State Route 98 (pre-1957) for the former SR 98